Shota Rustaveli was a Georgian poet.

Shota Rustaveli may also refer to:

 Shota Rustaveli Peak, a mountain.
 , a Russian cargo ship
 MS Shota Rustaveli, a former cruise ship
 Shota Rustaveli State Prize, a state prize of Georgia.
 Shota Rustaveli State University, educational institution in Georgia.
 List of things named after Shota Rustaveli